Dihar is a village and an ancient archaeological site  (approximately 3,200 years old) of great antiquarian importance brought into the limelight by Maniklal Sinha. Located  in the Bishnupur subdivision of the Bankura district in the Indian state of West Bengal.

Geography

Location

Note: The map alongside presents some of the notable locations in the subdivision. All places marked in the map are linked in the larger full screen map.

History
Belonging to the days of copper-Bronze Age civilisation and with an intricate narrative more than three millennia old, it is one of the earliest sites of human habitation discovered in Bengal which shows successive layers of prehistory, proto-history and history. Going by the styles of pottery (Black and Red Ware, Red Slipped Ware, Grey Ware, Northern Black Polished Ware, etc. found on different and sometimes intermixed levels), microliths, metallurgical fragments, beads, shells, skeletons, terracotta figurines, homesteads, debitage, shards of bone, and habitational refuge one can place this site in the same archaeo-cultural horizon as Pandu Rajar Dhibi. By about 1200-1000 BCE chalcolithic proto-urban people had settled on the northern banks of the Dwarakeswar, most probably belonging to a socio-culturally and technologically advanced branch of the Austroasiatic ethno-linguistic group.  After this early proto-historic period, stretching from the copper-Bronze Age to the early Iron Age of the pre-Maurya to the Shunga eras, nothing noticeable has been discovered at Dihar till confirmed Saivite activities beginning roughly from around the 13th-14th centuries CE.

Demographics
According to the 2011 Census of India, Dihar had a total population of 815 of which 416 (51%) were males and 399 (49%) were females. Population below 6 years was 84. The total number of literates in Dihar was 450 (61.56% of the population over 6 years).

Culture
The remains of the Shnareshwara (ষাঁড়েশ্বর) and Shaileshwara (শৈলেশ্বর) Shiva temples, built upon one of the primary chalcolithic/æneolithic habitational mounds, are some of the major attractions at Dihar. Either king Prithwi Malla of the Malla dynasty of Bishnupur had commissioned the temples (their architectural style being referred to as 'rekha deul') to be constructed in 1346 CE (the date being highly debatable academically) or, as deduced from their structural and architectural affinities, had them repaired, restored and reconsecrated in 1346 CE, as the two temples could have been built by monarchs from earlier dynasties in the form of twin Jain/Buddhist monuments at around the period when the Siddheshwara temple was built nearby at Bahulara at some point of time during the Pala era. Moreover, till date, much academic debate remains over the exact dates of their construction.
The unkempt laterite stone walls of the temples have suffered badly from centuries of erosion but intricate floral designs and miniature human figurines captured in dramatic poses can still be made out. Furthermore, some eroded or defaced images of divinity can also be seen upon the stone panels. Pilgrims, to this day, gather in the area during Shivratri.

Both the Shnareshwara and Shaileshwara temples are included in the List of Monuments of National Importance in West Bengal by the Archaeological Survey of India (serial no. N-WB-28 & 29).

See also - Bengal temple architecture

Dihar picture gallery

References

External links
Maniklal Sinha

Former populated places in India
Archaeological sites in West Bengal
Tourist attractions in Bankura district